Aboubakar Oumarou (born 4 January 1987) is a Cameroonian professional footballer. He is most often deployed as a forward. Having started his professional career in China, he has played in four different Serbian clubs. Oumarou has been capped by the national team of Cameroon.

Club career

Early career
Oumarou started his professional career in China with Yanbian before moving to Changsha Ginde where he played in the 2007 and 2008 Chinese Super League. In the 2009 winter transfer window, Milan Živadinović discovered Oumarou in China and after that, he was sold to the Serbian club Red Star Belgrade. Oumarou stayed there for only six months before he signed for another city club OFK Beograd, for the 2009–10 season.

Vojvodina
After playing an entire season with OFK, Oumarou moved to FK Vojvodina in the summer of 2010. In Vojvodina, he was elected three times in a row as Vojvodina Supporters' Player of the Year for the 2010–11, 2011–12 and 2012–13 seasons by the unofficial club fansite fkvojvodina.com.

His first match of the 2012–13 season was against Lithuanian club Sūduva on 19 July 2012, in the second qualifying round for UEFA Europa League. In that game, he scored a goal in the last minute of the match in a 1–1 home draw. A week later he also scored against Sūduva and enrolled assists in the away victory 4–0. A week later after winning against Suduva 4–0, he scored a goal against the Rapid Wien and so helped the Vojvodina to win rapid and closer to the play-off of the UEFA Europa League. His first goal of the new season of Serbian SuperLiga scored on 28 October 2012 against Javor. Oumarou scored the goal in the 77th minute of the match in a penalty shootout. On 1 December 2012, he scored twice against his former club Red Star Belgrade.

On 31 January 2013, thanks to his much-needed contribution to the club over the years, Oumarou signed a new one-year contract with Vojvodina.

Waasland-Beveren
On 9 August 2013, Oumarou signed a two-year deal with Belgian side Waasland-Beveren. On 18 August 2013, he has made his debut for Waasland-Beveren against Anderlecht and he spent 45 minutes on the pitch. On 15 February 2014, in 78th minute he scored his first goal for Waasland-Beveren against OH Leuven in a 3–1 home win.

Partizan
On 30 June 2015, after two years he returned to Serbia and signed a two-year deal with Partizan. Oumarou has scored his first goal in Partizan on 8 July in a friendly match against Hungarian club Vasas in a 1–4 win. He made his official debut for the club in a Second qualifying round UEFA Champions League, against Dila Gori on 14 July 2015. In the second leg of the second qualifying round for the Champions League, Aboubakar Oumarou scored a goal in the victory of his team 0–2.

On 17 September 2015, Oumarou scored twice in a 3–2 home victory over Dutch club AZ in the opening round of the Europa League group stage. Oumarou against AZ Alkmaar scored 400th goal of Partizan in European competitions. Oumarou was declared as a player of the first round of the Europa League and this is the first time that a player from the Serbian club is the player of round in a European competition. On 1 October 2015, Oumarou was injured 22 minutes into the match and had to leave the game against Augsburg. He had missed the match against Athletic Bilbao in the third round of the group stage of the Europa League on 22 October 2015. On 5 November 2015, Oumarou has scored equalizer at San Mamés in the defeat of his team 's 5–1. On 26 November 2015, Oumarou scored the equalizer a header after a cross Nikola Ninković, and in 89 minutes he was after a fantastic solo raid assisted to Andrija Živković score a winning goal in 1–2 away victory against AZ. earning Abubakar man of the match honors against AZ.

Shenzhen
On 25 February 2016, Aboubakar signed a two-year deal with China League One side Shenzhen. After scoring 24 goals in 62 appearances, he left the club in July 2018 due to the limit of the foreign player slots.

International career
Oumarou got his first call-up from the national team of Cameroon for a 2013 African Cup of Nations qualifier on 8 September 2012 against Cape Verde. He made his debut against Cape Verde as a substitute for Yannick N'Djeng in the 67th minute.

Already having 2 caps for Cameroon, Oumarou was again called again in November 2015, for the 2018 FIFA World Cup qualifiers against Niger on 13 and 17 November 2015.

Career statistics

Club

International

Honours

Individual
 Serbian SuperLiga Team of the Year: 2010–11, 2012–13 (with Vojvodina)
 Serbian Cup Top Scorer: 2008–09

References

External links
 
 

1987 births
Living people
Footballers from Yaoundé
Cameroonian footballers
Cameroonian expatriate footballers
Cameroon international footballers
Association football forwards
Yanbian Funde F.C. players
Changsha Ginde players
Red Star Belgrade footballers
OFK Beograd players
FK Vojvodina players
S.K. Beveren players
FK Partizan players
Shenzhen F.C. players
Al-Qadsiah FC players
FK Napredak Kruševac players
Chinese Super League players
China League One players
Belgian Pro League players
Serbian SuperLiga players
Saudi Professional League players
Expatriate footballers in Belgium
Expatriate footballers in China
Expatriate footballers in Serbia
Expatriate footballers in Saudi Arabia
Cameroonian expatriate sportspeople in Belgium
Cameroonian expatriate sportspeople in China
Cameroonian expatriate sportspeople in Serbia
Cameroonian expatriate sportspeople in Saudi Arabia